The Calamian Islands or the Calamianes is a group of islands in the province of Palawan, Philippines. It includes:
 Busuanga Island
 Coron Island
 Culion Island
 Calauit Island
 Malcapuya Island
 Banana Island
 Pass Island
 Calumbuyan Island
 several minor islets

History
Historically, before the Spanish came, the Calamianes was part of the nation of Sandao a vassal state of Ma-i at nearby Mindoro. Then, the Calamianes fell to the Brunei and Sulu Sultanates. Eventually, the Calamianes was site of the Spanish politico-militar Provincia de Calamianes. It became the site of a Presidio or a Spanish military garrison, and the small group of islands received, almost 100 Spanish and Mexican soldier-colonists in the 1670s. The Spanish Empire later purchased mainland Paragua from the Sultan of Borneo. During the American occupation (1898-1948), the old Provincia de Calamianes was dissolved and jointly administered with the Island of Paragua as the new Province of Palawan.

During the American occupation and up until recently, Culion Island was host to a leper colony. Busuanga Island hosts the largest town, Coron, in the Calamian Islands. Coron Island is known for having the cleanest inland body of water in the Philippines, called Kayangan Lake. Calauit Island is known for hosting a number of endangered African animal species. Diving spots, with coral reefs and sunken  Japanese shipwrecks, also lies within the waters of these islands.

Geology
Part of the North Palawan Block, Busuanga and Culon islands consist mainly of the Liminangcong Formation, a Permian to Late Jurassic chert.  This chert forms the distinguishing mountain ranges, with the Middle-Late Jurassic Guinlo Formation clastics forming the valleys on Busuanga. Coron Island is distinguished by its Late Triassic Coron Limestone.

References

External links

 
Archipelagoes of the Philippines
Archipelagoes of the Pacific Ocean
Archipelagoes of Southeast Asia
Maritime Southeast Asia